The ARIA Streaming Chart ranks the best-performing streaming tracks of Australia. It is published by Australian Recording Industry Association (ARIA), an organisation who collects music data for the weekly ARIA Charts.

Chart history

See also
2016 in music
ARIA Charts
List of number-one singles of 2016 (Australia)

Notes
Every issue since 1375 lists the peak position of "Don't Let Me Down" by The Chainsmokers as number one even through it never topped the chart.

Number-one artists

References

Australia Streaming
Streaming 2016
Number-one Streaming Songs